Malcolm Greenidge (25 August 1860 – 8 September 1926) was a Barbadian cricketer. He played in one first-class match for the Barbados cricket team in 1895/96.

See also
 List of Barbadian representative cricketers

References

External links
 

1860 births
1926 deaths
Barbadian cricketers
Barbados cricketers
People from Saint Michael, Barbados